Aileen Marie Quinn (born June 28, 1971) is an American actress, singer and dancer. She is best known for her role as the title character in the 1982 film Annie.

Early life
Quinn was born on June 28, 1971, and raised in Yardley, Pennsylvania. The oldest child of Helen Ann Quinn and Andrew Quinn Sr., she is the older sister of Andrew Quinn Jr. She began dance lessons when she was 4 at Knecht Dance Academy in Levittown, Pennsylvania, learning ballet and tap dance. 

When she was young, Quinn was introduced to show business by her mother, who was a TV, radio, and stage singer/actress then elementary school teacher. Quinn begged to audition for a part in a local community theater production of Annie Get Your Gun and won a role. She performed in additional community productions.

Raised in Far Hills, New Jersey, she attended Grey Nun Academy during elementary school and attended Oak Knoll School of the Holy Child in Summit, New Jersey for high school.

Taking a break after her child acting career, at the age of 18, Quinn decided to focus on school. She graduated from Drew University in 1994. She was a language major with a minor in political science, and is a member of Sigma Delta Pi, a Spanish honor society.

Career
After obtaining an agent, Quinn won a small role in the film Paternity and commercial work in New York City. She began appearing in television commercials including Planters Cheez Balls, Shake ‘n Bake and Northern Bathroom Tissue. At age 8 she landed the role in New York City of the "swing orphan" (understudy to all of the orphans except Molly and Annie) in the Broadway production of Annie.

After eight auditions over the course of a year, and up against over 8,000 other competitors, Quinn received the title role in the 1982 movie Annie, directed by John Huston. Annie earned Quinn two Golden Globe nominations, a win for "Best Actress" from the Youth in Film Awards, and a Razzie for "Worst New Star". Aileen was 9 years old when she was cast as Annie.

Aileen Quinn was under contract for several years with Columbia Pictures to make other Annie sequels which never materialized. During this time, she continued performing in lead roles in regional theater in such shows as The Wizard of Oz (Dorothy), Bye, Bye Birdie (Kim), Annie (Annie), Shenandoah (Jenny), and A Day in Hollywood/A Night in the Ukraine (Harpo).  She also lent her voice to two animated cartoon specials which aired on national television, The Charmkins and The Wizard of Oz.  The Annie film soundtrack album went platinum, and subsequently Quinn released her own album, Bobby's Girl, in 1982. Soon after that release, she starred as Princess Zora in the classic fairy tale The Frog Prince, which was released on videocassette and aired on the Disney Channel several times.

After graduation from college, Quinn once again took to the stage.  In 1994, she appeared as Bette in Oliver! at Paper Mill Playhouse.  She toured the US for more than five years with three Broadway national tours: Fiddler on the Roof (Chava), Peter Pan (Tootles/Jane) and Saturday Night Fever (Annette). She studied Shakespeare in London, where she appeared in As You Like It and Twelfth Night at LAMDA. Off-Broadway productions include Dreamstuff (Princess), Creature (Elizabeth) and Yiddle With a Fiddle (Yiddle). Regional theater credits up to the present include The Unsinkable Molly Brown (Molly), That Was Then (World Premiere Play-April Gregory), and Funny, You Don't Look Like a Grandmother (her Daughter).

Quinn appeared in a few small roles in independent films between 2006 and 2010, most notably portraying Lily in Annie at Theatre Aspen. She hosted Generation Gap, an interactive sitcom used to teach kids how to resolve conflicts. It was written and directed by filmmaker Edna Harris and aired on PBS in 2004. Quinn played a minor role in the 2009 film Multiple Sarcasms which stars Timothy Hutton and Mira Sorvino.

Quinn was an adjunct theater professor at Monmouth University in West Long Branch, New Jersey. Some of the school's campus was the site of the film version of Annie. She was awarded an honorary degree from Monmouth University in 2009. Quinn was also a Spanish, drama, and dance teacher at Hudson Catholic Regional High School in Jersey City, New Jersey.

She has her own band, Aileen Quinn and The Leapin' Lizards. Quinn met her bandmates after a neighbor heard her singing in her apartment, then introduced Quinn to the other musicians. They released their first album, Spin Me, in 2015. They released their second album, Lightning and Thunder, in November 2019.

Personal life
Quinn is fluent in Spanish. She spent six months with a family in Chile as part of an exchange program, and considers it one of her life's most rewarding experiences. As of 2022, she has never been married and has no children, and is an aunt and godmother.

Filmography

Discography

Albums
 Bobby's Girl released November 17, 1982, Columbia Records
 Spin Me released 2015, Independent Label
  Lightning and Thunder released 2019, Independent Label

Soundtracks
 Annie Original 1982 Motion Picture Soundtrack released May 1982, Columbia Records

Singles
 Tomorrow released 1982, Columbia Records
 At Christmas Time released December 20, 2016, Independent Label
 Auld Lang Syne released December 20, 2016, Independent Label

References

External links
 
 Aileen Quinn and The Leapin' Lizards

1971 births
Actresses from New Jersey
Actresses from Pennsylvania
American child actresses
American film actresses
American television actresses
American voice actresses
American stage actresses
Drew University alumni
Living people
American child singers
Monmouth University faculty
American women pop singers
American female dancers
Dancers from New Jersey
Dancers from Pennsylvania
American musical theatre actresses
20th-century American actresses
People from Far Hills, New Jersey
People from Yardley, Pennsylvania
20th-century American singers
20th-century American women singers
21st-century American women singers
Child pop musicians
21st-century American singers
Columbia Records artists
Interscope Records artists
Epic Records artists
Warner Records artists
American women academics